Madhepura district is one of the thirty-eight districts of Bihar state, India, and Madhepura town is the administrative headquarters of this district.  Madhepura district is a part of Kosi division.

History
Madhepura is part of the Mithila region and the people here speak the Maithili language.
Mithila first gained prominence after being settled by Indo-Aryan peoples who established the Mithila Kingdom (also called Kingdom of the Videhas).
During the late Vedic period (c. 1100–500 BCE), Videha became one of the major political and cultural centers of South Asia, along with Kuru and Pañcāla. The kings of the Videha Kingdom were called Janakas.
The Videha Kingdom was later incorporated into the Vajjika League, which had its capital in the city of Vaishali, which is also in Mithila.

During British Raj, the district of Madhepura was dominated by the Yadav Zamindars of Murho Estate, who were the biggest landlords of the district.

Madhepura district as it stands now was carved out of Saharsa district and got the status of revenue district on 9 May 1981. Prior to that, Madhepura was a sub-division under Bhagalpur district with effect from 3 September 1845.The munsif  court was established in 1865 at Madhepura.Earlier munsif court was in Kishanganj.Sub Judge Court was established here  in 1944 . It was on 1 April 1954 that Saharsa district was carved out of Bhagalpur district.

Geography
Madhepura district is surrounded by Araria and Supaul district in the north, Khagaria and Bhagalpur district in the south, Purnia district in the east and Saharsa district in the West. It is situated in the Plains of River Koshi and located in the Northeastern part of Bihar at latitude between 25°. 34 to 26°.07' and longitude between 86° .19' to 87°.07'.

The district has 2 sub-divisions - Madhepura and Uda Kishunganj, 13 blocks, 13 police stations, 170 panchayats and 434 revenue villages. The total population of Madhepura, as per census of the year 2001 is 15,24,596 of which 7,96,272 are male and 7,29,324 are female. Literacy rate is 36.9% as against the national rate of 64.8% and state rate of 47%. The density of population is 859 per km2.

Climate
The maximum temperature of this district ranges from 35 to 45 degree Celsius and the minimum temperature varies from 7 to 9 degree Celsius. The average rain fall in this district is 1300mm.

Politics 
  

|}

Economy
In 2006 the Ministry of Panchayati Raj named Madhepura one of the country's 250 most backward districts (out of a total of 640). It is one of the 36 districts in Bihar currently receiving funds from the Backward Regions Grant Fund Programme (BRGF).

An electric locomotive factory has been set up at Madhepura by the Indian Railways in a joint venture with Alstom SA of France. The factory has the distinction of manufacturing the most powerful railway engine in India, the WAG-12.

Sub-divisions
Madhepura district comprises the following Sub-Divisions:
Madhepura
Uda Krishanganj

Blocks

 Madhepura
 Ghelardh
 Singheshwar
 Gamhariya
 Shankarpur
 Kumarkhand
 Murliganj
 Gwalpara
 Bihariganj
 Udakishunganj
 Puraini
 Alamnagar
 Chousa

Demographics

According to the 2011 census Madhepura district has a population of 2,001,762, roughly equal to the nation of Slovenia. This gives it a ranking of 232nd in India (out of a total of 640). Its population growth rate over the decade 2001-2011 was  30.65%. Madhepura has a sex ratio of 914 females for every 1000 males, and a literacy rate of 53.78%. 4.42% of the population lives in urban areas. Scheduled Castes and Scheduled Tribes make up 17.30% and 0.63% of the population respectively.

At the time of the 2011 Census of India, 38.43% of the population spoke Maithili, 37.15% Hindi and 5.71% Urdu as their first language. 18.04% were classified as speaking a language under 'Other' Hindi in the census. Around 25% of total population of the district are of Yadav caste.

Religious place
Singeshwar temple
Madhepura is also in the limelight for Singheshwar Temple that the Istha Linga of Lord Shiva established in it. The Barah Purana also refers to Singheshwar as Shringeshwar. Mahakavi Vidyapati also refers to it in his literature in the 14th century. The Valmiki Ramayana gives due reference of Rishi Shringa (Rishyasringa)  Ashram. Lord Shiva has been imagined to be residing on the bank of his favourite and affectionate river Kosi in the epic Kumar Shambhavam written by Mahakavi Kalidas. As per another belief, Lord Vishnu himself established this linga. The present temple was erected by Kushan dynasty. In early survey, the temple is recorded in the name of one Bhanu Das. They say that a night's stay at Singheswar gives the fruit of the gift of thousand cows.
Dakini Sthan, Alamnagar Block

Nayanagar Bhagwati Sthan, Nayanagar, Gwalpara BlockBaba Vishu Raut, Lowalagan. Chousa
Kali mandir, Ramnagar [kumarkhand block]

Government institutions and courts
Governmental institutions in Madhepura include:
Municipal Corporation
Collectorate
Office of the Divisional Commissioner
District Court, Madhepura
Urban Improvement Trust (UIT)

Health services

Healthcare is provided by a combination of public and private-sector hospitals.
Sadar Hospital, Madhepura
Madhipura Christian Hospital.

Education
834 Govt. schools are imparting education in the district. Bhupendra Narayan Mandal University is situated at the district headquarter, Madhepura and adding glory to the educational atmosphere of this district.

List of Educational Institutes
 B.N.Mandal University Mahepura
 P.Sc.College,
 Commerce College,
 Madhepura College,
 C.M.Sc College,
 R.P.M. College
 Jawahar Navodaya vidyalaya,
 Shiv Nandan Prasad Mandal High School
 Rash Bihari High School
 Kiran Public School, Holy Cross, Holy angels, (Website)
 B R Oxford Residential Public School, Murligang Madhepura
SAMIDHA GROUP
 Madhepura Public School
 K.P.College Murligang
 B.L.High School Murligang
 Parasmani High School Babu Babhni
 Govt. High School Amari Murliganj Madhepura
 M.M. High School Kumarkhand
 Project kanya High school Kumarkhand
 Durgapur, bhddhi, Manguwar
 Ved Vyas Inter College Amleshwar Nagar Madhepura
 Ved Vyas Degree College Amleshwar Nagar Madhepura
 St Williams Residential School, Karpuri Chowk, Madhepura
 Holy Cross Girls School, Shastri Nagar Madhepura
 South Point Public School, Main Road Madhepura
 Holy Cross School, N. H. 107 Chakla Chowk Madhepura
 Maya Vidya Niketan, Naya Nagar, Madanpur, Madhepura
(Website)
 DeiGratia International School,Tuniyahi Uttarwari, Madhepura, Bihar.()

Transport
Madhepura is connected with road ways and railways.
See the Block-wise transport Map here.

Roadways
The district is connected with neighbouring districts and with nearby cities outside the state. National highway No.107 and National Highway No.106 passes through the district.

Daily buses carry passengers inter-state as well as within the city.

Railways
The district is linked with broad gauge Rail of North Eastern Railway.
It is connected to Patna, Bihar.
The Town is a halt for around 4 trains.

Airways
Nearest Airport is at 116.8 km in Darbhanga via SH-56 and supaul.

Media
The Radio Stations are following:

Newspapers

Dainik Jagran
Dainik Bhaskar
Hindustan
Madhepura Times
Prabhat Khabar

Festivals
Shivratri is the most celebrated festival of Madhepura. Common Indian Festivals such as Holi, Diwali, Durga Puja, Vijayadashami, Saraswati puja and Moharram are celebrated with great pomp and show in the city.

Notable person
Rash Bihari Lal Mandal, Zamindar of Murho Estate.
Kamleshwari Prasad Yadav, politician
B.P. Mandal, 7th Chief Minister of Bihar and chairman of the Second Backward Classes Commission (popularly known as the Mandal Commission).

References 
 []

External links 
 Official website
 Madhepura Information Portal

	

 
Kosi division
Districts of Bihar
1981 establishments in Bihar